Suede (also known in the US as The London Suede) are an English rock band formed in London in 1989 by singer Brett Anderson, guitarist Justine Frischmann, and bass player Mat Osman. Drawing inspiration from glam rock and post-punk, Suede were dubbed "The Best New Band in Britain" by Melody Maker in 1992, and attracted much attention from the British music press. The following year their debut album Suede went to the top of the UK Albums Chart, becoming the fastest-selling debut album in almost ten years. It won the Mercury Music Prize and helped foster 'Britpop' as a musical movement, though the band distanced themselves from the term. 

The recording sessions for their second album, Dog Man Star, were fraught with difficulty and ended with guitarist and composer Bernard Butler departing after confrontations with the other members. Guitarist and composer Richard Oakes replaced him and joined the band right before the accompanying tour. Although a commercial disappointment at the time, the album was met with a generally enthusiastic reception on release and has over time been lauded as one of rock music's great albums. In 1994, Suede would become a component of the Britpop "big four", along with Oasis, Blur and Pulp.

In 1996, following the recruitment of keyboard player Neil Codling, Suede went on to greater commercial success with Coming Up. The album reached number one in the UK, producing five top ten singles and becoming Suede's biggest-selling album worldwide. Despite problems within the band, Suede's fourth album, Head Music (1999), was a British chart-topper. The album was promoted heavily with the band receiving considerable press coverage on its release, however the response from fans and critics was less enthusiastic than for previous records. Codling left the band in 2001, citing chronic fatigue syndrome, and was replaced by Alex Lee. The band's fifth album, A New Morning (2002), the first following the collapse of Nude Records, was a commercial and critical disappointment, and the band disbanded the following year. In 2004, Anderson briefly reunited with Butler to form The Tears, before embarking on a solo career two years later.

After much speculation Suede reformed in 2010 for a series of concerts. Three years on from their reunion gigs, Suede released their sixth album, Bloodsports. It was well received by critics and returned the band to the top ten in the UK. Their seventh album, Night Thoughts, followed in 2016 and became an even bigger critical and commercial success than its predecessor. Their eighth studio album, The Blue Hour, was released in September 2018. It became the group's first top five record since Head Music. Their ninth and most recent studio album, Autofiction, was released in September 2022.

History

1989–1991: Formation and early years 

Brett Anderson and Justine Frischmann met in 1988 while studying at University College London and became a couple soon afterwards. Together with Anderson's childhood friend Mat Osman, they decided they had the core of a band, and spent hours a day playing songs by Roxy Music, The Smiths, David Bowie and The Cure. After deciding that neither Anderson nor Frischmann had the skill to be a lead guitarist, the band placed an advert in NME in the magazine's 28 October 1989 issue seeking to fill the position: "Young guitar player needed by London based band. Smiths, Commotions, Bowie, Pet Shop Boys. No Musos. Some things are more important than ability. Call Brett." The advert attracted the interest of nineteen-year-old Bernard Butler, who soon auditioned to join the band. The band settled on the name Suede. Lacking a drummer, the band initially used a drum machine. Despite Frischmann's efforts as the band's de facto manager, the band primarily played small-scale gigs around Camden Town in London.

Suede's first breakthrough came with their second demo Specially Suede which they sent to compete in Demo Clash, a radio show on Greater London Radio run by the DJ Gary Crowley. "Wonderful Sometimes" won Demo Clash for five Sundays in a row during 1990, leading to a recording contract with the Brighton-based indie label RML. The song appeared on a cassette compilation in April 1990 representing Suede's first official release. After a series of gigs with an unreliable drum machine, Suede decided to recruit a full-time drummer. Justin Welch briefly fulfilled the role, though he only lasted six weeks before joining the Crawley band Spitfire. He did, though, stay long enough to record two songs with the band, which were set to be released as the "Be My God"/"Art" single on RML Records. The band was dissatisfied with the result, and most of the 500 copies pressed were destroyed. Suede placed another advert seeking a replacement. To the band's surprise, it was answered by the Smiths’ former drummer, Mike Joyce. He ultimately turned down the job as he felt Suede still had to forge their own identity. He felt that by being in a band that had similarities to the Smiths, he would have done them more harm than good. In June 1990, Suede found a permanent drummer, Simon Gilbert, through Ricky Gervais, who initially worked in the music industry and managed the band before turning to comedy. Both worked at the University of London Union (ULU). After hearing the demo and realising the band did not have a drummer, Gilbert asked to audition.

By spring 1991, Anderson and Frischmann had broken up. Frischmann started dating Blur frontman Damon Albarn. She believed the band could accommodate the new situation. The situation grew tense, Butler recalled: "She'd turn up late for rehearsals and say the worst thing in the world – 'I've been on a Blur video shoot.' That was when it ended, really. I think it was the day after she said that that Brett phoned me up and said, 'I've kicked her out.'" After Frischmann's departure the character of the group changed. "If Justine hadn't left the band," Anderson said, "I don't think we'd have got anywhere. It was a combination of being personally motivated, and the chemistry being right once she'd left." Anderson and Butler became close friends and began writing several new songs together. Still, the band's music was out of step with the music of its London contemporaries as well as the American grunge bands. Anderson said, "For the whole of 1991, A&R men wouldn't give us a second look."

Through the end of 1991 and early 1992, Suede received a number of favourable mentions in the music press, receiving slots at shows hosted by NME and attended by significant musical figures such as the former Smiths singer, Morrissey. A gig at the ULU in October 1991, which caught the media's attention, was Frischmann's final gig. John Mulvey of the NME, the journalist who first wrote about Suede was there. He said, "They had charm, aggression, and... if not exactly eroticism, then something a little bit dangerous and exciting."

1992–1993: Signing and early success 
After seeing the band perform at an NME show in January 1992, Saul Galpern approached them about signing to his independent record label Nude Records. Suede eventually signed a two single deal to Nude in February 1992 for the sum of £3,132. Following Nude's offer, Suede attracted further interest from Island Records and East West Records, who were keen to sign the band long term. Suede were being hailed as "the next big thing" and, before the release of the band's first single, Melody Maker featured the band on the cover on 25 April, with the headline "Suede: The Best New Band in Britain". The band's first single, "The Drowners", attracted attention for its sharp contrast to the dying Madchester scene and the US grunge sound of the time. A moderate hit, "The Drowners" reached number 49 on the UK Singles Chart in May. The band was then approached by Geffen Records and, although the Geffen deal was very attractive (Galpern described it as "insane"), the band still had other offers to consider. In September 1992, Suede released a second single, "Metal Mickey", which reached number 17 in the charts. It was the only Suede single to enter the US Modern Rock top 10, peaking at number 7. Shortly after the release of "Metal Mickey", Suede signed to Nude/Sony. Galpern was determined to sign the band in the long term and struck a deal with Sony – making them a tiny independent label with major company backing. The contract gave Suede creative controls such as the artwork on their releases.

Anderson soon became notorious for causing controversy, such as his infamous quote that resurfaced in interviews and articles in the following years, that he was "a bisexual man who never had a homosexual experience". In February 1993, Suede went from highly touted indie band to major chart contenders with their third single, "Animal Nitrate", which went into the UK top ten. The single earned them a last-minute invitation to play at that year's Brit Awards ceremony. Writing in 2005, The Times''' Victoria Segal looked back to the band's early career, saying Suede's "sexually fluid lyrics made them a rallying point for the alienated, one of the few British bands since the Smiths who united as much as they divided." Comparisons were being made with David Bowie, though Suede sounded nothing quite like anybody else around at the time, and soon they fell upon what critics quickly deemed was a new movement. Anderson recalls, "I had always been fascinated by suburbia, and I liked to throw these twisted references to small-town British life into songs. This was before we had that horrible term Britpop."

Before Suede had released an album, they dominated the music press on the strength of just three singles, setting high expectations for the forthcoming album. Suede entered the British charts at number one, registering the biggest initial sales of a debut album since Frankie Goes to Hollywood's Welcome to the Pleasuredome a decade before. It sold over 100,000 copies in its first week of release, going gold on its second day. At the time it was hailed as "the most eagerly awaited debut since Never Mind The Bollocks by the Sex Pistols." Some notable press at the time was the front cover of the April 1993 issue of Select, which is seen by many as the start of Britpop. The album won the 1993 Mercury Prize. The band donated the entire £25,000 in prize money to Cancer Research. This was the only album released in the US under the name "Suede", where it remains the band's highest selling release.

Following the success of the album, the band toured extensively in Europe, receiving major coverage by MTV. In July, Suede gave a benefit concert for Red Hot Organization at "The Grand" in London, inviting Siouxsie Sioux to perform a version of Lou Reed's "Caroline Says" with Butler. Suede then prepared for an American tour in summer 1993. During the tour, tensions began to develop between Butler and the rest of the band. On the first American tour tensions peaked in Los Angeles, when Butler disappeared during a soundcheck. The gig went ahead, but for the rest of the tour the two parties barely spoke. The tensions grew worse on the second American tour mainly because Butler's father had died, which forced Suede to cancel the tour prematurely. Butler disliked the band's indulgence on the tour during his bereavement, in which he became so alienated from the band that he even travelled separately. Suede's American success was limited as they had already begun to be upstaged by their opening act, The Cranberries, who received the support from MTV that Suede lacked. At times, Butler left the stage while Suede were performing and persuaded a member of The Cranberries to fill in for him. Moreover, a lounge singer's lawsuit forced the band to stop using the trademarked American name "Suede". For their subsequent releases and shows in the United States, the band used the name "The London Suede". Anderson was not happy about having to change the band's name for the US market, saying, "The London Suede is not the name I chose for the band, I didn't change it happily, and I'm not going to pretend I did."

1994–1995: Butler's exit and Dog Man Star

In February 1994, the band released the stand-alone single "Stay Together", which became their highest-charting single at the time, reaching number three in the UK. The single was backed by a collection of strong B-sides. The new expansive sound, however, fractured the band and led to the departure of Butler. Despite the success of the single, the band has since distanced itself totally from the song, an aversion usually attributed to problems with Butler at the time. In the aftermath of "Stay Together", Anderson isolated himself in a house in Highgate and began to write songs for Suede's next album. It was at this time that Anderson distanced himself from what was dubbed the "laddish Britpop movement," which he was seen by many to have set the scene for its emergence. Bands such as Blur, Oasis and Pulp began to dominate the music scene, while Suede became more experimental and introverted. Tensions grew worse during the recording of the album when Butler criticised Anderson in a rare interview, claiming that he worked too slowly and that he was too concerned with rock stardom. Of Anderson he said, "He's not a musician at all. It's very difficult for him to get around anything that isn't ABC."

Around this time, journalist Neil Strauss wrote that Suede were a band who were "unafraid to be out of step with its peers." The band started to record excessively lengthy songs at the behest of Butler. Osman said that he, Anderson and Gilbert often thought these tracks were the result of Butler trying to wind them up. Anderson recalled that Butler had largely recorded his parts separately from the rest of the band. This was usually done in shifts, with Anderson coming to the studio in the evenings after Butler had recorded his guitar parts during the day. The point at which tensions became unbearable was when Butler clashed with the producer Ed Buller, who he insisted should be sacked as he wanted to produce the record himself. Butler then gave Anderson an ultimatum demanding that the producer be fired or he would leave. "I called his bluff," said Anderson. Days after his wedding, Butler returned to the studio to find he was not being allowed in and his guitars were left out on the street. According to John Harris's Britpop history, The Last Party, the final words Butler uttered to Anderson were "you're a fucking cunt." Butler left the band with a quarter of the recording still to be finished. In the first interview the band gave as a three-piece, Anderson foresaw the scenario, telling NMEs Steve Sutherland: "I saw it coming two years ago. It was no shock, I don't think he ever really wanted to be in the band or anything that goes with it."

Led by the single "We Are the Pigs", Suede's second album, Dog Man Star, finally appeared in October 1994. The album was very well received by critics in the UK who wrote favourably of the band's new experimental direction. It entered the UK Albums Chart at number three, but slid quickly down the charts. The singles from the album charted poorly. Reviews in the US were more mixed, with some critics comparing it unfavourably to the singles from the first album; and several labelling it as pretentious and other synonyms to that effect. Rolling Stone would describe it as "one of the most pretentious albums ever released by a major label." Nevertheless, despite not gaining mass exposure at the time, it steadily garnered a legacy throughout the decade and beyond as one of rock music's great albums. In September 1994, Suede announced that 17-year-old Richard Oakes was to be the new guitarist. After reading about Butler's departure, he had sent a demo tape to the band's fanclub. When Gilbert heard Anderson playing back the tape whilst going through audition tapes, he mistakenly believed it to be an early Suede demo. Oakes' first official duty as a member of Suede was an appearance in the "We Are the Pigs" video. He then co-wrote his first music with Suede, the B-sides for the "New Generation" single, "Together" and "Bentswood Boys". Suede embarked on a long international tour during late 1994 and spring 1995, before disappearing to work on their third album. In 1995, the band contributed a track to The Help Album charity compilation, covering Elvis Costello's "Shipbuilding".

1996–2000: New line up and continuing success

In the autumn of 1995, the band was joined by new member Neil Codling, a cousin of Gilbert who played keyboards and second guitar. His first appearance was at a fanclub gig at the Hanover Grand on 27 January 1996, which turned out to be one of Suede's most important gigs. A short set devoid of Butler songs was well received by critics, "A set that says. 'No Need'," observed Steve Sutherland in NME. Even before Dog Man Star was released, bassist Mat Osman told Select magazine in September 1994 that he wanted to move on from the regimented recording process and expansive multi-layered guitar sounds of that era and focus on more radio-friendly pop music; citing "Losing My Religion" by R.E.M. as a song that "doesn't show off in the slightest and is still brilliant." Anderson had a similar outlook, saying that in contrast to the band's previous albums, which he felt "suffered at certain times from being quite obscure," he intended the forthcoming album to be "almost like a 'greatest hits'." Suede's third album, Coming Up, was released September 1996 and was preceded by the successful lead single, "Trash" in July. The single was popular and tied with "Stay Together" as the band's highest-charting UK single, reaching number three. The album would become the band's biggest mainstream success, earning the band five straight top-10 singles and becoming a hit throughout Europe, Asia and Canada. Coming Up never did win an audience in America, partially because it appeared nearly a year after its initial release and partially because Suede only supported it with a three-city tour. The tour was not helped by problems in Boston, Massachusetts, in which the band's music equipment was stolen, leaving them to play remaining shows with acoustic guitars. Nevertheless, the album topped the UK chart and became the band's biggest-selling release, setting expectations high for the follow-up. With the success of the album, Suede secured top billing at the 1997 Reading Festival. Suede's next release was Sci-Fi Lullabies, a collection of B-sides, which reached number nine on the UK Album Chart. The compilation was well-received, with disc one of two being described by critics as the band's strongest collection of songs.

By the time the compilation was released in 1997, the Britpop movement was noticeably waning in popularity, and the band had decided to split with their long-time producer Ed Buller before commencing work on the follow-up to Coming Up. Before focusing work on their next album, the band recorded a version of "Poor Little Rich Girl" for the Twentieth-Century Blues: The Songs of Noel Coward in 1998. Despite being backed by their second-highest-charting single, "Electricity", Suede's fourth album, Head Music, did not evoke the critical and listener enthusiasm that previous records did, though it once again took the band to number one on the UK Albums Chart. A synthesiser-infused album that focused less on guitar riffs and more on keyboards, it was produced by Steve Osborne, who had worked with Happy Mondays and New Order. While the record was heavily promoted with some strong financial backing, and received almost widespread critical enthusiasm from the UK music press, the consensus with people close to the band was a feeling that things were not quite right. Richard Oakes was aware of the fans' disapproval of the album, as well as Anderson's more gaunt-like appearance and Oakes' own admission of spending two years "being pissed out [his] face and being out of shape."  Moreover, many critics felt the record's lyrics were too shallow and lacking in substance. Though others praised the album, feeling that the band were again taking a different direction and charting new territory.

The next three singles released from the album failed to enter the top 10, breaking a run stretching back to the 1996 single "Trash". Anderson also attracted more criticism from fans for his frequent use of redundant vocabulary and limited lyrical themes. The track which received the most attention and criticism was "Savoir Faire". Some critics felt that the album's lyricism could be linked to Anderson's heavy drug use at the time, especially when he later admitted that he "was a crack addict for ages". Speaking of his addiction, which plagued him for two and a half years, Anderson said, "Anyone who has ever tried crack will know exactly why I took it. It's the scariest drug in the world because the hit you get from it is so, so seductive. I wanted to experience that, and I did – repeatedly." Suede headlined the Roskilde and V Festivals in July and August 1999 respectively. During 2000, there was press speculation that Suede were on the verge of disbanding, which was not helped by Codling's absence from some European gigs. Anderson denied these claims and insisted that Codling was healthy and that they were keen to record the next album. For the whole of 2000, Suede retreated from the public and played only one gig, in Reykjavik, Iceland. The band premiered several new songs that eventually appeared on the final album.

2001–2003: Commercial disappointment and break-up
Not long after the release of Head Music, Nude Records effectively ceased to exist. Like many of their labelmates, Suede ended up signing to Nude's parent company/distributor Sony to record the band's fifth album, A New Morning. Between the release of Head Music and A New Morning, Suede wrote and recorded "Simon" as the title theme for the film Far From China. The long and troubled gestation of the new album saw the keyboard player, Codling, leave the band, citing chronic fatigue syndrome, to be replaced by Alex Lee, formerly of Strangelove. In concert, Lee played keyboards, second guitar, backing vocals and occasionally harmonica. The album title, according to Anderson, referred to "a fresh start, a new band and a new fresh outlook" – the singer had been addicted to heroin and crack cocaine, which was having an increasingly deleterious effect on his health. Anderson claimed that A New Morning "was the first ever Suede record that wasn't influenced in its making by drugs".

Although the band began work with Tony Hoffer producing, the album was produced by Stephen Street (The Smiths, Blur). Overall, seven different recording studios and four producers were used during the two years spent recording A New Morning, with costs estimated at £1 million. The album was a commercial disappointment which failed to enter the top 20 and it was never released in the US. A New Morning sharply divided fans of the band even more so than Head Music and critical reaction was decidedly lukewarm. Furthermore, the mainstream public interest had long disappeared. Only two singles, "Positivity" and "Obsessions", were released, the fewest singles taken from any of the band's albums, and neither charted particularly well. Anderson has since stressed his disappointment with Suede's final album, stating "We made one Suede album too many. 'A New Morning' is the only one I don't believe in as much as the other Suede records and I totally believed in the first four, even 'Head Music' which divided the fans." Mat Osman told journalist Jon Cronshaw in October 2013 that: "It sounded like a Suede album that had been made by a committee – it was quite bland. We're all quite ashamed of it". Anderson went further in his criticism in 2016, saying: "It's a poor record and we should never have released it."

In September 2003, Suede played five nights at the Institute of Contemporary Arts in London, dedicating each night to one of their five albums and playing through an entire album a night in chronological order, with B-sides and rarities as encores. In October 2003, Suede released a second compilation album Singles, and an accompanying single "Attitude", which charted at number 14 in the UK. The band had begun working on a follow-up album to A New Morning, which was planned to be released after the Singles compilation. Anderson said that, "Most of the new material is more aggressive and less song based than A New Morning." He added, "We're spending a lot of time working on tracks that sound nothing like traditional Suede." The planned album was never released.

On 28 October 2003, Anderson made the decision to call it a day. The same day Suede were booked to perform "Beautiful Ones" on V Graham Norton to promote the Singles compilation. Jeremy Allen was the last person to interview the band just before the Norton appearance. Allen would see the band again some six weeks later at the aftershow party following the final gig at the London Astoria in December. At the aftershow event, Osman revealed to Allen that they decided to call it quits less than a minute after their last interview. As they were walking along the corridor to the studio set, Anderson whispered into Osman's ear: "Let's not do this anymore." Less than a week after the decision to call an end to Suede, the band's biography, Love and Poison was released on 3 November. On 5 November, the band announced that there would be no more projects under the Suede name for the foreseeable future – effectively announcing the end of the band, as they stated on their website: "There will not be a new studio album until the band feel that the moment is artistically right to make one." Anderson also made a personal statement saying: "There has been speculation about record sales and chart positions, but the bottom line is I need to do whatever it takes to get my demon back." Suede's last concert at the London Astoria on 13 December 2003 was a two-and-a-half-hour marathon show, split into two parts plus encore. Anderson made an announcement, saying, "I just want you to know. There will be another Suede record. But not yet."

2010–2013: Reunion and Bloodsports

Following persistent rumours, Saul Galpern, the boss of the band's former label, Nude Records, officially announced on 15 January 2010 that Suede would be playing together again. "It's a one-off gig," he explained of the show, which featured the band's second incarnation. The band played at the Royal Albert Hall in London as part of the 2010 Teenage Cancer Trust shows on 24 March 2010. Anderson described the comeback show as his favourite gig and the pinnacle of his 20-year career. Despite the gig initially being billed as a one night only reformation, when questioned on the German radio station MotorFM in early February, Anderson refused to confirm that the band would not continue. The band subsequently announced two UK 'warm up' gigs prior to the Royal Albert Hall show, at the 100 Club in London and The Ritz in Manchester. The three gigs were well received by critics from various newspapers.

In August, the band played at the Skanderborg Festival in Denmark and Parkenfestivalen in Bodø, Norway. In September, the band announced that they would release The Best of Suede on 1 November 2010. The two-disc compilation, put together by Anderson, consisted of 18 of the band's 20 singles on disc one; and a mixture of album tracks and popular B-sides on disc two. Shortly after the release, Suede made a short European tour from late November into December covering Spain, France, Belgium, Sweden, the Netherlands and Germany. The band concluded the tour on 7 December at the O2 Arena in London.

After their biggest show ever at the O2 Arena in London, Brett confirmed that Suede were in the mood for more shows. 2011 would see the band perform at several festivals around the world. In January, they announced their first festival appearance of that year, playing at the SOS 4.8 Festival in Murcia, Spain in May. Other festivals included Blackberry's Live & Rockin' Festival at the Jakarta International Expo, Indonesia in March 2011; and the Coachella Valley Music and Arts Festival in April 2011. This marked the group's first live American show since 1997. Suede played at the Latitude Festival in Suffolk on 17 July 2011. The final performance was at the Berlin Festival on 9 September 2011, directly following the Asian tour in August. In June 2011, following the success of the compilation album, the band released remastered and expanded editions of all five studio albums. They also performed the albums Suede, Dog Man Star and Coming Up at the O2 Brixton Academy in London over three nights on 19, 20 and 21 May 2011, and at the Olympia Theatre, Dublin, on 24, 25 and 26 May.

Suede embarked on a full Asian tour, which began in late July in Jisan, South Korea, and finished at the Summer Sonic festival in Tokyo, Japan, on 14 August 2011. Suede performed in Athens on 11 September 2011, and ended the band's touring commitments in Russia on 16 and 18 December 2011 where they showcased the new songs "Falling Planes", "The Only", "Someone Better", "I Don't Know Why", "Cold War", "Future Nightmare" and "Sabotage". Suede began recording a new album with Ed Buller in 2012 and Brett Anderson stated that of the songs showcased in Russia, only "Sabotage" was thus far in contention. On 7 January 2013, the band announced that the sixth studio album, Bloodsports, would be released in March. The announcement was accompanied by "Barriers", a song from the album, as a free download. They released their first single in a decade "It Starts and Ends with You" on 4 February. Bloodsports was well received by critics and has been their best reviewed album since the band's 1996 album Coming Up. On 12 April, Suede announced on their website the dates for their forthcoming European tour. The tour began on 26 October 2013 at the Leeds O2 Academy and finished on 23 November at the Paradiso in Amsterdam. Suede subsequently added a further three shows to the beginning of the tour. They played additional shows in Southampton, Southend and Bristol on 22, 23 and 24 October.

2014–2016: Night Thoughts
In late January 2014, Anderson announced that Suede were working on a new album, he estimated the album would be released in 2015 as the band are in the writing stage for the album. On 7 September 2015, the band announced that their new album, Night Thoughts, was to be released on 22 January 2016, alongside a feature film directed by photographer Roger Sargent. On 24 September, the first single from the album "Outsiders" was released. The band performed the album in full on 13 and 14 November at the London Roundhouse. The album was released as a standalone CD issue, as a doublepack with the movie on DVD and as a limited numbered issue with CD, DVD and book. Anderson felt that unlike previous albums, for the first time the band had the freedom to do their own thing. Without the pressure to aim for the mainstream, the band deliberately eschewed from writing any radio hits. Night Thoughts was very well received by both fans and critics, receiving widespread press coverage on its release. Following on from the success of Bloodsports, Night Thoughts charted at no. 6 in the UK. A series of concert dates in the UK and Europe to support the release followed. The first half of each show consisted of the band playing the album tracks in sequence, while onstage behind a gauze screen with the movie projected onto it. The second half consisted of a mix of back catalogue material, including a number of b-sides and obscure songs. The band also did a number of instore acoustic appearances in HMV stores to promote the release, including Q&A sessions and movie screenings.

During the period were the band wrote and toured Night Thoughts, they also commemorated some of their earlier releases. Once again the band performed as part of the Teenage Cancer Trust charity at the Royal Albert Hall on 30 March 2014. This time, the band performed Dog Man Star in full to mark its 20th anniversary. The set was followed by b-sides from that era, and then a greatest hits finale, which included new song "I Don't Know How to Reach You". Furthermore, to celebrate the actual 20th anniversary release of the album, Suede released a limited edition box set in October 2014. A similar 20th anniversary reissue was released for Coming Up in September 2016.

2018–2020: The Blue Hour
On 28 April 2018, Suede announced their upcoming eighth studio album. On 30 April 2018, they officially revealed the name The Blue Hour as its title, which would later release on 21 September 2018. On 4 May 2018, Suede announced the dates for the European tour which were scheduled to start shortly after the launch of the album. The tour began on 29 September in Berlin, Colombiahalle and finished 13 October at the Eventim Apollo in London. A final show was added to the tour on 14 October at the Bord Gáis Energy Theatre in Dublin. On 5 June 2018, the band shared their first single from the album, "The Invisibles", with an accompanying video. Five singles were released from the album, matching the number of singles from Night Thoughts, with latest single "Wastelands" released 29  October. The album was released to a generally favourable reception and became their highest-charting album since Head Music in 1999. Suede announced their first 2019 show, as Friday night headliners at Pennfest, Penn, Buckinghamshire. In November 2018, the band released a documentary entitled Suede - The Insatiable Ones directed by Mike Christie. The feature-length documentary explores the highs and lows of Suede's career, with unprecedented access, new interviews and unseen footage from the band's archive. It was shown as part of a 'Suede Night' 24 November on Sky Arts, along with the band's 2010 comeback gig at the Royal Albert Hall. On 10 December, the band announced new dates as part of a 2019 UK tour. The tour began at Newcastle's O2 Academy on 15 April and concluded on 28 April at the Corn Exchange in Cambridge.

2020–present: Autofiction
In November 2020 an announcement on the official Suede Facebook page stated that a new album was currently being recorded. The same post also asked for fans to contribute some vocals for some as-yet-untitled tracks. In a BBC interview Anderson suggested that the record would be "nasty, brutish and short." On 9 July 2021, Music Week revealed that Suede had signed to the BMG label for the release of their next album, though no release date had been confirmed. 
On 23 May 2022, eighteen months after the band announced that they were recording a new album, Suede revealed the title of their ninth studio album as Autofiction, which was released via BMG 16 September. On the same day, the band revealed the name of their lead single as "She Still Leads Me On", which was premiered that day at a concert at the Cirque Royal in Brussels. The song is inspired by Anderson's late mother. Speaking about the new album, Anderson said: "Autofiction is our punk record. No whistles and bells. Just the five of us in a room with all the glitches and fuck-ups revealed; the band themselves exposed in all their primal mess". Speaking to Billboard, Anderson further explained:  "our intention was also to recover certain aesthetic lines in the sound ... [the] post punk sound is back very strongly in the limelight".

Two more singles, "15 Again" and "That Boy on the Stage" were released before the album. According to Anderson the former is "a song about falling in love with life for the first time," and the latter "[is] about persona. It’s about the people we become." On 12 September, the band announced the dates of a March 2023 UK tour. The 2023 tour is due to begin at Bath's Forum on 3 March, closing at O2 Academy Brixton on 25 March, 30 years after the band made their debut performance at the London venue in May 1993. On 13 September, the band announced its first United States concert tour since 1997, a co-headlining North American tour with Manic Street Preachers. Both bands will play ten shows in the US and two shows in Canada throughout November. Suede was one of the bands performing at the 2022 Formula 1 Singapore Grand Prix. 

in November 2022, the band played a 12-date North American tour with the Manic Street Preachers.

Legacy and influence
A significant part of Suede's legacy consists in having kickstarted the Britpop scene which eventually overshadowed the band's own achievements in the public mind. Alexis Petridis wrote in 2005, "These days, rock historians tend to depict Suede's success as a kind of amuse bouche (appetizer) before the earth-shattering arrival of Britpop's main course". In an article about the British music press's "ferocious one-upmanship campaign" of the mid-1990s, Caroline Sullivan, writing for The Guardian in February 1996, noted Suede's appearance as an unsigned band on the cover of Melody Maker as a pivotal moment in the history of Britpop:

Suede appeared on Melody Maker's cover before they had a record out... The exposure got them a record deal, brought a bunch of like-minded acts to the public's attention, and helped create Britpop. It was the best thing to happen to music in years, and it mightn't have happened without that Suede cover.

The year following the Melody Maker cover saw Suede captivate a pop phenomenon of critical praise and hype. Not since the dawn of the Smiths had a British band caused such excitement with the release of just a few singles. A March 1993 article in The Independent wrote that "Suede have had more hype than anybody since the Smiths, or possibly even the Sex Pistols. The reviews are florid, poetic, half-crazed; they express the almost lascivious delight of journalists hungry for something to pin their hopes on." Suede are regarded by many as the first British band to break into the mainstream from the new wave of alternative rock in the '90s. With their glam rock style and musical references of urban Britain, Suede paved the way for acts such as Oasis, Blur and Pulp to enter the British mainstream. They were influential in returning some of the creative impetus to English guitar music in a scene increasingly dominated by Madchester, grunge and shoegaze. Even beyond their own shores, American heavy metal personality Eric Greif declared that Suede "reinvented and repackaged glam in a creative way, and how refreshing that was as a counterpoint to the drab grunge of the time."

Suede's laurels would remain intact through their early career until Butler's departure, which the press signalled as the end of Suede. As new rock bands were arriving on the scene, British pop culture was in the midst of a shift towards lad culture and the same critics who championed Suede were now plotting to extinguish them. In February 1995, music critic J.D. Considine said the band "quickly fell victim to the build-'em-up-then-knock-'em-down mentality of the English music press." On the eve of the release of Coming Up, Neil McCormick of The Telegraph wrote: "Cast in the classic mould of the androgynous rock star, Anderson appears curiously anachronistic in a British rock scene polarised between the laddishness of Oasis and the suburbiana of Blur and Pulp." In a 2007 article in The Telegraph, Bernadette McNulty wrote that while the frontmen of those bands "are all being bestowed with reverential status, Brett Anderson has become the lost boy of Britpop". Since the Britpop movement ceased to exist, like many bands associated with it, Suede's popularity sharply declined. As one writer put it at the end of Suede's career, "Suede slid from zeitgeist into a smaller, pocket-sized cult band." In the same article, Anderson spoke about their legacy:

"It's not in my nature to be bitter. We may have been overlooked somewhat, but all you need to do is listen to the music. Our legacy speaks for itself." He added, "...Fate dealt us this card, and I don't think we've done particularly badly with it. Music today seems so very worthy, so very dull. Nobody wants to stick their neck out any more, and I think that is a great pity. We did, and we left our mark."

"Still one of the great British bands of the '90s," David Bowie told Select in 1996. "They have the enviable knack of taking the rather pathetic fumble of a quick fuck under the pier and extracting those few golden moments that many years later convince oneself that, for one brief flickering moment, one was as inspired as Romeo or, in some cases, Juliet. The poor things are bound to be an institution by the year 2000. Dame Brett, anybody?"

At the 2010 Q Awards, Suede were honoured with the "Inspiration Award". Suede were honoured with the "Godlike Genius Award" at the 2015 NME Awards. New Order frontman Bernard Sumner presented it to the band, following a video introduction of the "fantastic" and "brilliant" Suede by comedian and Suede fan Ricky Gervais.

Influence on other artists
Multiple artists have cited the band as an influence. Kele Okereke, lead singer of London band Bloc Party, said that he started making music because of Suede's Dog Man Star, and called it "the first record [he] fell in love with". Kate Jackson, lead singer of English indie rock band The Long Blondes has spoken in interviews of her love for Suede. In 2007, she admitted that Suede got her into music, saying: "Suede's debut album was unlike anything I'd heard before. It was the opposite of grunge, which I hated, and my escape from Bury St Edmunds." Christopher Owens of the Californian indie pop group Girls named Suede as one of his major influences, and his vocal style has been compared to that of Anderson. The band have also served as an influence on acts such as Sons and Daughters, Dum Dum Girls, and Drowners, who took their name from the similarly titled Suede song. Canadian rock band Destroyer named their 2017 album ken after the original title for "The Wild Ones".

Additionally, Suede's songs have been covered by other artists. "My Insatiable One" was performed by Morrissey during his Your Arsenal tour in 1992. "The Drowners" was recorded by the Manic Street Preachers as a b-side. "Animal Nitrate" was covered by the Libertines in concert during their tour reunion in 2015: a cover version of the same song was also recorded by Basement for the Further Sky EP. "Beautiful Ones" was recorded by Kim Wilde on her cover album Snapshots in 2011. Apoptygma Berzerk recorded a cover version of "Trash" on their Rocket Science album.

Awards and nominations
{| class="wikitable sortable plainrowheaders" 
|-
! scope="col" | Award
! scope="col" | Year
! scope="col" | Category
! scope="col" | Nominee(s)
! scope="col" | Result
! scope="col" class="unsortable"| 
|-
! scope="row"|Abilu Music Awards
| 2016
| International Rock Album of the Year
| Night Thoughts
| 
|
|-
! scope="row" rowspan=6|Brit Awards
| rowspan=5|1994
| British Breakthrough Act
| rowspan=2|Themselves
| 
| rowspan=5|
|-
| British Group
| 
|-
| British Album of the Year
| Suede
| 
|-
| British Single of the Year
| rowspan=2|"Animal Nitrate"
| 
|-
| rowspan=2|British Video of the Year
| 
|-
| 1995
| "The Wild Ones"
| 
|
|-
! scope="row" rowspan=13|GAFFA Awards (Denmark)
| rowspan=2|1993
| Best Foreign Album
| Suede
| 
|rowspan=13| 
|-
| Best Foreign New Act
| rowspan=3|Themselves
| 
|-
| rowspan=3|1994
| Best Foreign Group
| 
|-
| Best Foreign Live Act
| 
|-
| rowspan=2|Best Foreign Album
| Dog Man Star
| 
|-
| rowspan=3|1996
| Coming Up
| 
|-
| Best Foreign Hit
| "Trash"
| 
|-
| rowspan=2|Best Foreign Band
| rowspan=4|Themselves
| 
|-
| rowspan=5|1999
| 
|-
| Best Foreign Live Act
| 
|-
| Best Foreign 90's Act
| 
|-
| Best Foreign Album
| Head Music
| 
|-
| Best Foreign Hit
| "Electricity"
| 
|-
! scope="row" rowspan=2|Mercury Prize
| 1993
| rowspan=2|Album of the Year
| Suede
| 
| rowspan=2|
|-
| 1997
| Coming Up
| 
|-
! scope="row" rowspan=12|NME Awards
| rowspan=2|1993
| Best New Band
| Themselves
|
|rowspan=8|
|-
| Best Single
| "The Drowners"
| 
|-
| 1994
| rowspan=3|Best Band
| rowspan=3|Themselves
| 
|-
| 1996
| 
|-
| rowspan=4|1997
| 
|-
| Best LP
| Coming Up
| 
|-
| rowspan=2|Best Single
| "Trash"
| 
|-
| "Beautiful Ones"
| 
|-
| 1998
| Radio 1 Evening Session of the Year
| Themselves
| 
|
|-
| rowspan=2|2000
| Best Album Ever
| Dog Man Star
| 
|rowspan=2|
|-
| Best Album
| Head Music
| 
|-
| 2015
| Godlike Genius Award
| rowspan=6|Themselves
| 
| 
|-
! scope="row" rowspan=4|Q Awards
| 1993
| Best New Act
| 
| rowspan=2|
|-
| 1999
| Best Live Act
| 
|-
| 2010
| Inspiration Award
| 
|
|-
| 2013
| Icon Award
| 
|
|-
! scope="row"|Rober Awards Music Prize
| 2013
| Comeback of the Year
| 
|
|-
! scope="row" rowspan=4|Smash Hits Poll Winners Party
| 1994
| rowspan=2|Best Alternative/Indie Type Band
| rowspan=3|Themselves
| 
|
|-
| rowspan=3|1996
| 
|rowspan=3|
|-
| Best Rock Outfit
| 
|-
| Best Album Cover
| Coming Up
| 

MembersCurrent membersBrett Anderson – vocals, tambourine (1989–2003, 2010–present)
Mat Osman – bass (1989–2003, 2010–present)
Simon Gilbert – drums (1991–2003, 2010–present)
Richard Oakes – guitars (1994–2003, 2010–present), backing vocals (2002-2003)
Neil Codling – keyboards, synthesizers, piano, guitars, backing vocals (1995–2001, 2010–present)Former members'Justine Frischmann – guitars (1989–1991)
Justin Welch - drums (1990)
Bernard Butler – guitars, keyboards, piano  (1989–1994)
Alex Lee – keyboards, piano, guitars, harmonica, backing vocals (1999 (touring member), 2001–2003)

 Timeline 

DiscographySuede (1993)Dog Man Star (1994)Coming Up (1996)Head Music (1999)A New Morning (2002)Bloodsports (2013)Night Thoughts (2016)The Blue Hour (2018)Autofiction (2022)

References

Bibliography
 Harris, John. Britpop!: Cool Britannia and the Spectacular Demise of English Rock. Da Capo Press, 2004. 
 Barnett, David. Love and Poison. Carlton Publishing Group, 2003. 
 Thompson, Dave. Suede''. Helter Skelter Publishing, 2005.

External links

 Suede official website

Britpop groups
English alternative rock groups
English glam rock groups
Musical groups from London
Musical groups established in 1989
Musical groups disestablished in 2003
Musical groups reestablished in 2010
Columbia Records artists
Sony BMG artists
Nude Records artists
Musical quintets
1989 establishments in England